Bergroth is a Swedish-language surname, more common in Finland than in Sweden.

Geographical distribution
As of 2014, 54.2% of all known bearers of the surname Bergroth were residents of Finland (frequency 1:24,322), 36.0% of Sweden (1:65,645), 3.1% of Argentina (1:3,287,963), 2.9% of Australia (1:1,981,156), 1.7% of the United States (1:51,607,325) and 1.2% of Norway (1:1,028,470).

In Finland, the frequency of the surname was higher than national average (1:24,322) in the following regions:
 1. Åland (1:2,153)
 2. Central Ostrobothnia (1:2,229)
 3. Southwest Finland (1:6,689)
 4. Ostrobothnia (1:17,380)
 5. Uusimaa (1:21,920)

In Sweden, the frequency of the surname was higher than national average (1:65,645) in the following regions:
 1. Gävleborg County (1:7,001)
 2. Västmanland County (1:21,614)
 3. Jönköping County (1:38,216)
 4. Uppsala County (1:43,720)
 5. Södermanland County (1:46,536)
 6. Stockholm County (1:53,419)

People
 Edvin Bergroth (1836–1917), Finnish engineer, businessman and vuorineuvos
 Ernst Evald Bergroth (1857–1925), Finnish physician and entomologist
 Kersti Bergroth (1886–1975), Finnish author and playwright
 Waldemar Bergroth (1852–1928), Finnish clergyman and politician
 Ilmi Hallsten née Bergroth (1862–1936), Finnish teacher and politician
 Jannika Wirtanen née Bergroth (b. 1985), Finnish singer

References

Swedish-language surnames